Kevin Fitzpatrick may refer to:
 Kevin Fitzpatrick (Gaelic footballer), Gaelic football player from County Laois in Ireland
 Kevin Fitzpatrick (Irish footballer) (born 1943), soccer player from Limerick in Ireland
 Kevin C. Fitzpatrick (born 1966), American non-fiction writer